Jack and Jenny is a 1963 West German comedy film directed by Victor Vicas and starring Brett Halsey, Senta Berger and Michael Hinz.

The film's sets were designed by the art director Ernst H. Albrecht. Location filming took place in Italy and Thailand.

Cast
 Brett Halsey as Jack
 Senta Berger as Jenny
 Michael Hinz as Josef Lancelot
 Marion Michael as Betsy
 Eckart Dux as Eduard
 Paul Klinger as Jonas
 Ivan Desny as Wladimir
 Friedrich Joloff as Victor
 Michael Verhoeven as Timothy
 Harry Liebauer as Lancelot
 Udo Kämper as Pierre
 Erich Fiedler as Onkel Baldwin
 Olga Tschechowa as Mutter Johannsen
 Katja Tisar as Fräulein Bauer
 Gisela Fritsch as Magda
Claude Farell as Barbara
 Karola Kyrath as Marina
 Beate Hasenau as Helga
 Brigitte Mira as Thea
 Barbara Saade
 Alexander Kerst

References

Bibliography
 Bock, Hans-Michael & Bergfelder, Tim. The Concise CineGraph. Encyclopedia of German Cinema. Berghahn Books, 2009.

External links 
 

1963 films
1963 romantic comedy films
German romantic comedy films
West German films
1960s German-language films
Films directed by Victor Vicas
1960s German films